Maria Elżbieta "Iga" Cembrzyńska (born 2 July 1939) is a Polish actress, singer, composer, screenwriter, film director, and producer. She runs her own film company, Iga Film. She was the wife of Polish film director Andrzej Kondratiuk.

First Iga Cembrzyńska studied philosophy at Uniwersytet Mikołaja Kopernika in Toruń and later at the National Higher School of Theatre in Warsaw from which she graduated in 1962. She performed in several prominent theatres in Warsaw like: Teatr Powszechny, Teatr Komedia and Teatr Ateneum.

She is best known for her film roles in The Saragossa Manuscript (1964) and almost  all films directed by her husband Andrzej Kondratiuk.

Filmography
 Salto (1965)
 The Saragossa Manuscript, Rękopis znaleziony w Saragossie (1965)
 Komedia z pomyłek (1967) (TV)
 Stawka większa niż życie (1 episode, TV series)
 Ściana czarownic (1967)
 Jowita (1967)
 Hydrozagadka (1970) (TV)
 Motodrama (1971)
 Skorpion, Panna i Łucznik (1973)
 Jak to się robi (1974)
 Smuga cienia (1976)
 Pełnia (1980)
 Levins Mühle (1980)
 Gwiezdny pył (1982)
 Hotel Polan und seine Gäste (1982) (TV)
 Yokohama (1982)
 Klakier (1983)
 Krzyk (1983)
 Engagement (1984) (TV)
 Widziadło (1984) (voice)
 Cztery pory roku (1985)
 Big Bang (1986) (TV)
 Rajska jabłoń (1986)
 Dziewczęta z Nowolipek (1986)
 Siekierezada (1986)
 Pay Off (1987) (TV)
 Crimen (1988) TV mini-series
 Powroty (1989)
 Mleczna droga (1991) (TV)
 Ene
 Panna z mokrą głową (1994)
 Wrzeciono czasu (1995)
 Słoneczny zegar (1997)
 Córa marnotrawna (2001)
 Szycie na goraco (2004) (TV)
 Bar pod młynkiem (2005) (TV)
 Na dobre i na złe (1 epiѕode, TV series)

External links
 
 Iga Cembrzyńska at www.culture.pl (in Polish)

Living people
1939 births
Polish actresses
Polish film actresses
Polish stage actresses
Nicolaus Copernicus University in Toruń alumni
People from Radom
Recipient of the Meritorious Activist of Culture badge